Luminex may refer to:

 Luminex Corporation, a biotech company based in Austin, Texas
 Luminex Software, a data storage company based in Riverside, California